The women's downhill event of the 1956 Winter Olympics at Cortina d'Ampezzo, Italy, was held on Mt. Tofana on Wednesday, 1 February.

The Swiss took the top two spots as Madeleine Berthod won the gold and Frieda Dänzer took the silver; Lucile Wheeler of Canada was the bronze medalist.  Forty-four women from sixteen countries finished the race.

Results
Wednesday, 1 February 1956
The race was started at 11:30 local time, (UTC+1).

Source:

See also

 1956 Winter Olympics

Notes

References
 

Women's alpine skiing at the 1956 Winter Olympics
Alp
Oly